Kapp Petermann (Cape Petermann) is the north point of the peninsula separating Austfjorden and Vestfjorden, northernmost in Dickson Land, Spitsbergen on Svalbard.
 
Named after August Petermann (1822–78), German geographer.

Headlands of Spitsbergen
Peninsulas of Spitsbergen